John King (1775September 1, 1836) was an American politician who served one term as a United States representative from New York from 1831 to 1833.

Biography 
John King was born in Kings District (now known as Canaan) in the Province of New York in 1775 where he attended the common schools. He was town supervisor of Canaan from 1806 to 1808; sheriff of Columbia County from 1811 to 1813 and 1815 to 1819, and town supervisor of New Lebanon, New York from 1819 to 1823, and in 1826 and 1829.  He was a member of the New York State Assembly in 1824.

Congress 
He was elected as a Democrat to the 22nd United States Congress (March 4, 1831 – March 3, 1833).

Death 
He died in New Lebanon on  September 1, 1836, and is interred in the Cemetery of Evergreens.

External links

1775 births
1836 deaths
Town supervisors in New York (state)
New York (state) sheriffs
Members of the New York State Assembly
Jacksonian members of the United States House of Representatives from New York (state)
19th-century American politicians
Burials in New York (state)

Members of the United States House of Representatives from New York (state)